Catherine Tyson (born 12 June 1965) is an English actress. She won the Los Angeles Film Critics Association Award for Best Supporting Actress for her performance in the film Mona Lisa (1986), which also earned her Best Supporting Actress nominations at the Golden Globes and BAFTA Awards. She has starred in The Serpent and the Rainbow (1988), Priest (1994), and Band of Gold (1995–1997). She won the British Academy Television Award for Best Supporting Actress in 2022 for her performance in the film Help.

Early life
Tyson was born in Kingston-upon-Thames on 12 June 1965, the daughter of an English social worker mother and a Trinidadian barrister father. She grew up in Liverpool, having moved there with her parents when she was two years old. She was a pupil at St Winefrides school in Dingle.  She attended Liverpool's Everyman Youth Theatre in her teens, and dropped out of college at 17 to pursue an acting career there.

Career

Tyson joined the Royal Shakespeare Company in 1984, taking the lead role in their performance of Golden Girls. Also in 1984, Tyson made an early TV appearance playing Joanna in Scully.

Tyson's film debut was in Mona Lisa (1986) as Simone, an elegant prostitute, a performance which brought her critical acclaim. Her other films include Business as Usual (1987), The Serpent and the Rainbow (1988), The Lost Language of Cranes (1991), Priest (1994) and The Old Man Who Read Love Stories (2001). Probably her best-known television appearance was also as a prostitute, Carol Johnson, in the ITV series Band of Gold.

In 2007, Tyson joined the cast of two long-running television series. She played  headmistress Miss Gayle in the BBC One school drama Grange Hill, and featured in the ITV soap opera Emmerdale as single mother Andrea Hayworth.

Tyson played Herodia in BBC Three's Liverpool Nativity, a modern adaptation of the traditional Christmas story. Recorded as a live event in Liverpool City Centre on 16 December 2007, it was broadcast several times over the Christmas period and repeated the following year.

In September 2009, Tyson enrolled at the adult learning centre City Lit on an access to higher education course in creative studies. She completed a degree in English and Drama at Brunel University in 2013.

In 2021, she guest starred in an episode of TV drama McDonald & Dodds.

In 2021, Tyson appeared in Channel 4 film Help playing Poll, an elderly resident of a care home during the Covid-19 pandemic; the following year she won the British Academy Television Award for Best Supporting Actress for her performance.

Charity work
Tyson hosted a charity event for the Sick Children's Trust on 17 November 2007, and again on 1 November 2008. The event, organised by Friends of Eckersley House, a committee supporting the charity's Leeds house, was held at the Haven Golden Sands resort in Mablethorpe, Lincolnshire. She is also one of the Honorary Patrons of the London children's charity Scene & Heard.

Personal life
Tyson married actor and comedian Craig Charles in 1984. Their son Jack was born in 1988. They divorced in 1989.

Awards and nominations

References and notes

External links
 

1965 births
Actresses from Liverpool
English television actresses
Best Supporting Actress BAFTA Award (television) winners
Black British actresses
English film actresses
English people of Trinidad and Tobago descent
Living people
People from Kingston upon Thames
Alumni of Brunel University London